Károly Fila (born 1 January 1996) is a Romanian professional footballer of Hungarian ethnicity who plays as a goalkeeper for FC Bihor Oradea. In February 2023, Fila signed for Olimpia Satu Mare, a club that he had previously played for almost 10 years ago as a youth.

International career
Károly Fila played 3 matches for Romania U-17 team.

References

External links
 

1996 births
Living people
People from Bihor County
Romanian footballers
Association football goalkeepers
Romania youth international footballers
CF Liberty Oradea players
FC Olimpia Satu Mare players
Liga II players
CS Șoimii Pâncota players
CS Minaur Baia Mare (football) players
ASC Daco-Getica București players
CS Sportul Snagov players
Nemzeti Bajnokság II players
Kazincbarcikai SC footballers
Liga III players
FC Bihor Oradea (2022) players
Romanian expatriate footballers
Romanian expatriate sportspeople in Hungary
Expatriate footballers in Hungary
Romanian sportspeople of Hungarian descent